Eschenlohe station is a railway station in the municipality of Eschenlohe, in the Garmisch-Partenkirchen district in Bavaria, Germany. It is located on the Munich–Garmisch-Partenkirchen railway of Deutsche Bahn.

Services
 the following services stop at Eschenlohe:

References

External links
 
 Eschenlohe layout 
 

Railway stations in Bavaria
Buildings and structures in Garmisch-Partenkirchen (district)